Bolshoy Khatymi (Ulaxan Xatımi) is a rural locality (a selo), one of two settlements, in addition to Chulman, in Chulman Urban Okrug of Neryungrinsky District in the Sakha Republic, Russia. Its population as of the 2010 Census was 311, of whom 156 were male and 155 female, down from 506 as recorded during the 2002 Census.

References

Notes

Sources
Official website of the Sakha Republic. Registry of the Administrative-Territorial Divisions of the Sakha Republic. Neryungrinsky District. 

Rural localities in the Sakha Republic